Frecăței is a commune located in Brăila County, Muntenia, Romania. It is composed of six villages: Agaua, Cistia, Frecăței, Salcia, Stoienești and Titcov.

References

Communes in Brăila County
Localities in Muntenia